Jay Ford Laning (May 15, 1853 – September 1, 1941) was an American lawyer and politician who served as a one-term U.S. Representative from Ohio from 1907 to 1909.

Early life and career 
Born in New London, Ohio, Laning attended the public schools, the Savannah (Ohio) Academy, and Baldwin-Wallace College in Berea, Ohio. He studied law. He was admitted to the bar in May 1875 and commenced practice in New London.
Laning was the local Justice of the Peace from 1875 to 1881, and served as a member of the village council in 1876.

He moved to Norwalk, Ohio, in January 1882, where he practiced law until 1885 and then engaged in the publishing business.
He served as a member of the city council 1887-1889, and was a member of the Ohio Senate from 1894 to 1898. He served as a delegate to the Republican National Conventions in 1904 and 1908.

Congress 
Laning was elected as a Republican to the Sixtieth Congress (March 4, 1907 – March 3, 1909). He was renominated in 1908, but withdrew and resumed the publishing business in Norwalk. He then devoted his time to the writing, editing, and publishing of law books and school textbooks.

Death
J. Ford Laning died in Norwalk on September 1, 1941, and was interred in Woodlawn Cemetery.

Publications

References

External links 

 Encyclopedia of Baldwin Wallace History: Jay Ford Laning

1853 births
1941 deaths
People from New London, Ohio
Republican Party Ohio state senators
Ohio lawyers
Baldwin Wallace University alumni
Republican Party members of the United States House of Representatives from Ohio